was a  after Kenchō and before Shōka. This period spanned the years from October 1256 to March 1257.

Change of era
 1256 : The new era name was created to mark an event or a number of events. The previous era ended and a new one commenced in Kenchō 8.

Events of the Kōgen era
 September 1, 1256 (Kōgen 1, 11th day of the 8th month): Kujō Yoritsune, also known as Fujiwara Yoritsune, died at the age of 39 years.
 October 14, 1256 (Kōgen 1, 24th day of the 9th month): Yoritsune's son and successor as Kamakura shōgun, Kujō Yoritsugu, also known as Fujiwara Yoritsugu, died at the age of 18 years.

Notes

References
 Nussbaum, Louis-Frédéric and Käthe Roth. (2005).  Japan encyclopedia. Cambridge: Harvard University Press. ;  OCLC 58053128
 Titsingh, Isaac. (1834). Nihon Odai Ichiran; ou,  Annales des empereurs du Japon.  Paris: Royal Asiatic Society, Oriental Translation Fund of Great Britain and Ireland. OCLC 5850691
 Varley, H. Paul. (1980). A Chronicle of Gods and Sovereigns: Jinnō Shōtōki of Kitabatake Chikafusa. New York: Columbia University Press. ;  OCLC 6042764

External links
 National Diet Library, "The Japanese Calendar" -- historical overview plus illustrative images from library's collection

Japanese eras
1250s in Japan